Kiprino is a rural locality (a village) in Petropavlovskoye Rural Settlement, Bolshesosnovsky District, Perm Krai, Russia. The population was 10 as of 2010. There are  streets.

Geography 
Kiprino is located on the Lem River, 33 km west of Bolshaya Sosnova (the district's administrative centre) by road. Permyaki is the nearest rural locality.

References 

Rural localities in Bolshesosnovsky District